Cliffside Gas Field is located in the Texas Panhandle bearing  west of Texas Highway 87 and  northwest of Amarillo, Texas. The Great Plains Panhandle area is located in Potter County, Texas within the vicinity of the unincorporated community Cliffside, Texas.

The Potter County oil and gas reservoir was permitted for fossil fuel exploration in May 1925. The Panhandle basin was nationally recognized as a helium reserve with an estimated  of discovered natural gas at the Cliffside field.

Amarillo Helium Plant

In April 1929, the United States government purchased  for a helium extraction plant located in west Amarillo within the unincorporated community of Soncy, Texas.

By August 1929, the Texas Panhandle helium plant received notable commendations from national news sources regarding the plants estimated helium gas production yields.

The Amarillo plant operated from 1929 to 1943 producing helium meeting the global demand for the monatomic gas. In 1968, the helium industry celebrated a centennial claiming Potter County, Texas as the "Helium Capital of the World."

First Helium Reservoir in North Texas
The oil and gas reservoir was the primary helium source for the United States during the 1910s and at the commencement of World War I. By 1921, the North Texas natural gas field was estimated as near gas depletion exceeding the Petrolia helium reserves-to-production ratio yields.

See also

References

Historical Video Archive

External links
 
 
 
 
 
 

1910 in Texas
Economy of Amarillo, Texas
Geography of Potter County, Texas
Oil fields in Texas
Potter County, Texas